St Stephen's Church is in Balcarres Avenue, Whelley, Wigan, Greater Manchester, England. It is an active Anglican parish church in the deanery of Wigan, the archdeaconry of Wigan and West Lancashire, and the diocese of Liverpool. Its benefice is united with that of St John, New Springs. The church is recorded in the National Heritage List for England as a designated Grade II listed building.

History
The first phase of the church was built between 1928 and 1930, the foundation stone being laid in November 1928, and the church being consecrated on 9 April 1930. It was designed by the Lancaster architect Henry Paley of Austin and Paley, and the church was built on land given by Lord Crawford. The first phase consisted of the east end of the church, and the first two bays of the nave and the aisles: this cost £9,863 (equivalent to £ in ). The church was completed in 1937–38, and a choir vestry was added, the cost of these additions being £5,253.

Architecture
St Stephen's is constructed in red and brown sandstone with green slate roofs, and is in Free Perpendicular style. Its plan consists of a nave with a clerestory and a south porch, north and south aisles, a chancel with a canted east end, a south vestry, and a single gabled bellcote standing at right angles to the south side of the chancel. At the west end are broad buttresses, with a canted baptistry between them. The west window has four lights, the east window has five lights, and the clerestory windows have three lights. Pollard and Pevsner in the Buildings of England series comment that it is "an odd time" for the architect to be continuing to use the style of the practice during the 1880s. The two-manual pipe organ, the third to be installed in the church, was made in 1964 by J. W. Walker & Sons Ltd. In 2011 the pipe organ was replaced with an electronic imitation produced by Johannus of Holland.

See also

List of churches in Greater Manchester
Listed buildings in Wigan
List of ecclesiastical works by Austin and Paley (1916–44)

Bibliography

Notes

References

Church of England church buildings in Greater Manchester
Grade II listed churches in the Metropolitan Borough of Wigan
Churches completed in 1938
20th-century Church of England church buildings
Gothic Revival church buildings in Greater Manchester
Austin and Paley buildings
Anglican Diocese of Liverpool